Mariusz Duda (born 25 September 1975) is a Polish musician and composer best known as the bassist and vocalist in the band Riverside.

Biography 
He started the career in the 1990s as a member of Xanadu, and later did guest vocals for Indukti's album S.U.S.A.R.. Aside from Riverside, which he joined in 2001, he started the side project Lunatic Soul, releasing the self-titled first album in 2008.

On 26 June 2020 he released his debut solo album called Lockdown Spaces, an electronic record composed during the recording sessions for Lunatic Soul's seventh album.

Discography

As a solo artist 
 Lockdown Spaces (2020)
 Claustrophobic Universe (2021)
 Interior Drawings (2021)
 Let's Meet Outside EP (2022)

With Riverside 

 Out of Myself (2003)
 Second Life Syndrome (2005)
 Rapid Eye Movement (2007)
 Anno Domini High Definition (2009)
 Shrine of New Generation Slaves (2013)
 Love, Fear and the Time Machine (2015)
 Wasteland (2018)

With Lunatic Soul 
 Lunatic Soul (2008)
 Lunatic Soul II (2010)
 Impressions (2011)
 Walking on a Flashlight Beam (2014)
 Fractured (2017)
 Under the Fragmented Sky (2018)
 Through Shaded Woods (2020)

With Meller Gołyźniak Duda 
 Breaking Habits (2016)
   Live (2018)

Guest appearances 
 Indukti – S.U.S.A.R.  (2004; guest vocals on three tracks: Freder, Cold Inside…I, Shade)
 Amarok – Metanoia  (2004; guest vocals on six tracks: Canticle, Rules, Look Around, Come What May, The Moment, The Day After…), Hunt  (2017; guest vocals and co-writing credits on one tracks)
 The Old Peace (2014; vocals, guitars and co-writing with Steven Wilson)
 iamthemorning – Lighthouse  (2016; guest vocals on one track: Lighthouse)

References

External links 

 Lunatic Soul website

Living people
Polish heavy metal bass guitarists
Progressive metal guitarists
Progressive metal bass guitarists
Mystic Production artists
Polish heavy metal singers
Polish rock singers
Polish keyboardists
English-language singers from Poland
1975 births
Polish lyricists
21st-century Polish male singers
21st-century Polish singers
Male bass guitarists
21st-century bass guitarists
Polish male guitarists